Tunstall or Tunstal may refer to:

Place names
United Kingdom
Tunstall, East Riding of Yorkshire
Tunstall, Kent
Tunstall, Lancashire
Tunstall, Norfolk, in the parish of Halvergate
Tunstall, North Yorkshire
Tunstall, Stafford, near to Eccleshall
Tunstall, Staffordshire, one of the six towns of Stoke-on-Trent
Tunstall, Suffolk
Tunstall, Sunderland
Tunstall, Devon, near Dartmouth, see Townstal
United States
Tunstall, Virginia
 Canada
Tunstall, Saskatchewan

People
 Arthur Tunstall (born 1922), Australian and international sport administrator
 Cuthbert Tunstall (1474–1559), English bishop and scholar
 Dori Tunstall (born 1972), American anthropologist
 Fred Tunstall (1897–1971), English footballer (Sheffield United, England national team)
 John Tunstall (1853–1878), New Mexico (USA) rancher of Lincoln County War fame
 Kate Tunstall, British scholar of French literature and interim Provost at Worcester College, Oxford
 KT Tunstall (Kate Victoria Tunstall, born 1975), Scottish singer-songwriter
 Marmaduke Tunstall (1743–1790), English ornithologist
 Martha Goodwin Tunstall (1838-1911), American Unionist, abolitionist and suffragist
 Pete Tunstall (1918-2013), English pilot and World War II German prisoner
 Thomas Tunstall (died 1616), English Roman Catholic priest
 William Tunstall, footballer
 Whitmell P. Tunstall (1810–1854), Virginia (USA) politician
 Tunstall Quarles (1781–1856), United States lawyer and politician
 Douglas Allen Tunstall Jr. (born 1967) (Tiny the Terrible), American professional wrestler and politician

Other
Tunstall coding, a computer encoding method that maps variable-length sequences of input symbols to constant-length code words
Tunstall Healthcare, a healthcare company
Tunstall Priory, a priory on Tunstall island near Redbourne